Bandwagon is a 1996 American film by writer/director John Schultz, starring Lee Holmes and Kevin Corrigan.

Production
Writer/director John Schultz used to drum for independent band The Connells but left them early on to start a filmmaking career. Bandwagon was not only the first feature film for Schultz but for a lot of the crew members as well. Schultz said, "On the shoot, we didn't really realize what we were doing right and what we were doing wrong and a lot of the problems we found in the editing room." The film was made in 1993 in Schultz's hometown of Raleigh, North Carolina and took six weeks to complete.

Greg Kendall is a singer/guitarist who was hired to write the songs for the band in the film. He was introduced to Schultz by mutual friend Doug MacMillan who plays Linus Tate in the movie. He said, "They were to have good songs, but they had to be believable. They couldn't be too stupid and they couldn't be too ornate." Schultz supplied the titles to the songs and Kendall wrote and sang most of them. They were recorded at Fort Apache Studios in Cambridge, Massachusetts. Eight of his songs appear in the film and he also composed the score. Kendall likes that "there's nothing MTV about it [the film]. It's naive, some would say to a fault. I would say it's a strength."

Reaction
The film debuted at the Sundance Film Festival in 1996. It was subsequently picked up by Lakeshore Entertainment, and as a result, is the first film to ever come out of that company.

Home media availability
The film was released on VHS in 1998. In 2013, Amazon.com began offering a manufacture on demand DVD release of the film.

References

External links
 
 

1996 films
Fictional musical groups
American rock music films
American musical drama films
Films shot in North Carolina
1990s musical drama films
Films directed by John Schultz (director)
Lakeshore Entertainment films
1996 directorial debut films
1996 drama films
1990s English-language films
1990s American films